Declier Creek is a small river in the Hart Ranges of the Northern Rockies of British Columbia.

Tributaries 

Annie Creek

Rivers of the Canadian Rockies